The Pilot. A Battle for Survival is a 2021 Russian WWII film written and directed by Renat Davletyarov, based on the real story, is dedicated to the pilot Aleksey Maresyev and other heroes of World War II (known in Russia as "The Great Patriotic War"), who found himself in similar circumstances, lost both legs, but still continued to fight.

The Pilot. A Battle for Survival was scheduled to be theatrically released in Russia on 2 December 2021 by Central Partnership.

Plot 
The film takes place at the beginning of World War II. The film tells about the pilot Nikolai Komlev, who defeated a German tank column, but his plane was shot down. Nikolai was able to land his plane in a forest clearing and suddenly realized that his problems were just beginning.

Cast

Production 

The film was produced in collaboration with the Russian Ministry of Culture and the Russian Film Foundation. Director Renat Davletyarov called the film his version of The Revenant.

Filming 
Some of the scenes (the hospital) were filmed in the fall and winter of 2018 at the Pokrovskoye-Streshnevo estate.

Principal photography began in January 2019 in the Novgorod Oblast. They went including in the Demyansky District, where in 1942 Aleksey Maresyev's plane was shot down. In addition to outdoor filming, there was filming in one of the pavilions of the Mosfilm Studios, against a green background, which was later replaced by another.

Release

Marketing 
The first teaser trailer of The Pilot. A Battle for Survival was released on 3 January 2021.

Theatrical 
The premiere was scheduled for 1 May, International Workers Day, but was later postponed to 4 November. After it was closed due to another wave of the quarantine plague in Russia, its release was postponed to 2 December 2021.

The premiere screening took place on 30 November at the "Karo 11 October" cinema center in Moscow. It will be released in the Russian Federation on 2 December 2021 by Central Partnership.

See also
 Tale of a True Man is a 1948 Soviet film, also based on the story of Aleksey Maresyev.

References

External links 
 

2021 films
2020s Russian-language films
2020s biographical drama films
2020s historical drama films
2021 war drama films
2020s survival films
Russian biographical drama films
Biographical films about military personnel
Russian historical drama films
Russian war drama films
Eastern Front of World War II films
Films set in 1941
Films set in the Soviet Union
Films set on airplanes
Russian independent films
Mosfilm films
Russian epic films
War epic films
Films about aviators
World War II aviation films
World War II films based on actual events
Russian World War II films
Films directed by Renat Davletyarov
Films shot in Russia
Films postponed due to the COVID-19 pandemic